Clearsprings Ready Homes is a British company which provides housing services, primarily for the Home Office. Clearsprings have operated all asylum seeker housing in Wales since 2012, and have also operated asylum seeker housing in England.

Accommodation and services provided by Clearsprings have been repeatedly criticised for their poor quality, with some asylum seekers living in what has been described as "dire living conditions".

History 
Clearsprings Ready Homes is a subsidiary of Clearsprings (Management) Ltd. and was previously part of Clearel Limited. In 2007, Clearsprings won a contract to operate Approved Premises for people on bail – it subsequently opened more than 160 housing units. The company was accused of failing to properly consult local councils about their accommodation.

In 2015 the company was investigated by HM Revenue and Customs relating to its taxes; it later paid more than £200,000 in a settlement. Clearsprings were also fined £60,000 in 2021 for offences relating to a property in Newport which included failing to maintain fire alarms.

In 2021 the company's directors were paid £7 million in dividends as they reported a £4.4 million annual profit.

Asylum seeker housing 
Clearsprings Ready Homes has provided accommodation for asylum seekers since at least 2000. It has operated all such accommodation in Wales since 2012, a contract which was valued at £119 million in 2016. The company currently has two ten-year contracts with the British government to operate accommodation for asylum seekers in Wales and the South of England until 2029, at a total cost of over £1 billion.

At temporary asylum seeker accommodation run by Clearsprings in Cardiff, residents were forced to wear red wrist bands to receive food. After the practice sparked controversy in 2016, including comments from the First Minister, Clearsprings reported that they would be scrapping the scheme. The accommodation, Lynx House, had also been found to be overcrowded and host to poor living conditions. Problems included damp carpets, malfunctioning fire alarms, and leaking plumbing. The Home Office received 59 complains about Clearsprings' accommodation services in 2016.

A 2019 investigation by The Guardian found that asylum seekers in Southall, London, were being housed in "dire living conditions" in properties managed by a company paid by Clearsprings, finding them to be overcrowded, lacking functioning facilities, and overrun with pests. Lawyers said the situation could be a breach of human rights legislation. The Home Office said that "urgent action" would be taken to rectify problems in the housing, and soon after the investigation was published improvements were made.

In June 2020, a three-year-old boy died at a house owned by Clearsprings. An investigation was opened to uncover the exact cause of death.

Since 2020, Clearsprings have operated asylum seeker housing at the former military camp in Penally, Pembrokeshire, and at Napier Barracks in Kent. Residents at these sites have gone on hunger strike and have attempted suicide. Volunteers working at the Napier barracks were made to sign confidentiality agreements under the Official Secrets Act. In January 2021 a fire was started at the Napier site; 14 men were arrested in response. Residents at these barracks reported that they went without electricity, heating, and clean drinking water after the fire. Some residents reported "repeated" complaints to Clearsprings over poor living conditions, including poorly cooked food. The Red Cross called on the UK government to remove all asylum seekers from the location due to the conditions.

In December 2021 another investigation by The Guardian revealed the poor conditions of asylum seekers living in Clearsprings operated flats in Uxbridge and South Ruislip, with residents housed for multiple years in accommodation which was too small, dirty, damp or poorly maintained. Clearsprings stated they would be making urgent repairs in response and moved some residents to other accommodation.

In January 2022 an investigation by Corporate Watch and The Canary revealed asylum seekers were being housed in an insect-infested hotel in London ran by Clearsprings. In addition to bed bugs, a family of eight reportedly experienced a ceiling caving in, water leaks from the apartment above, insufficient food, lack of hot water, lack of electricity, and a dangerous electrical installation.

References

External links 

 

Property companies of the United Kingdom